Florence Morlighem (born 10 April 1970) is a French politician who was Member of Parliament for Nord's 11th constituency from 2020 to 2022.

Political career 
She was a substitute in the 2017 election.

See also 

 Women in the French National Assembly

References 

1970 births
Living people
La République En Marche! politicians

People from Roubaix
Politicians from Lille
21st-century French politicians
21st-century French women politicians
Deputies of the 15th National Assembly of the French Fifth Republic
Women members of the National Assembly (France)
Members of Parliament for Nord